Dragan Mićić (born 20 June 1969) is a Bosnian Serb professional football manager and former player who is the manager of Loznica.

Playing career
Born in Bijeljina, SR Bosnia and Herzegovina, he started his career in FK Podrinje Janja. In 1993, he moved to Serbian club FK Loznica playing in the First League of FR Yugoslavia. After three seasons showing excellent attacking skills, he signed with the Serbian giants, the 1991 European and World Champions Red Star Belgrade where he stayed until 2000. Next he moved to another First League club, FK Rad. In the winter break of the 2001–02 season, he moved to Slovenia and played, until the end of that season, in Slovenian Prva Liga club FC Koper. Next, he was back to Serbia, this time signing with FK Budućnost Banatski Dvor, that, since 2006, is going to be known as FK Banat Zrenjanin, playing five seasons with them in both Serbian Superliga and the second tier Serbian First League. He played in FK Radnički Obrenovac for the rest of his career.

Managerial career
On 25 March 2011, Mićić was appointed manager of Drina Zvornik. In the 2013–14 season he won the First League of RS with his team and promoted Drina back to the Bosnian Premier League. He left the club in March 2015. He then worked for some time with the Serbian national youth teams.

On 28 December 2017, he was appointed as manager of Zvijezda 09, which he was until 26 February 2018. Then in the summer of 2018, Mićić became the manager of Sloga Gornje Crnjelovo, who he promoted to the First League of RS in the 2017–18 season. On 9 April 2019, he became the manager of Loznica.

Honours

Player
Red Star Belgrade
First League of FR Yugoslavia: 1999–2000
FR Yugoslavia Cup: 1996–97, 1997–98, 1999–2000

Manager
Drina Zvornik
First League of the Republika Srpska: 2013–14

Sloga Gornje Crnjelovo
Second League of the Republika Srpska: 2017–18 (East)

References

External links
Profile and stats at Srbijafudbal
Player profile and stats until 2003 at Dekisa.Tripod

1969 births
Living people
People from Bijeljina
Serbs of Bosnia and Herzegovina
Association football forwards
Yugoslav footballers
Bosnia and Herzegovina footballers
FK Podrinje Janja players
FK Loznica players
Red Star Belgrade footballers
FK Rad players
FC Koper players
FK Budućnost Banatski Dvor players
FK Banat Zrenjanin players
FK Radnički Obrenovac players
First League of Serbia and Montenegro players
Slovenian PrvaLiga players
Serbian SuperLiga players
Bosnia and Herzegovina expatriate footballers
Expatriate footballers in Serbia and Montenegro
Bosnia and Herzegovina expatriate sportspeople in Serbia and Montenegro
Expatriate footballers in Slovenia
Bosnia and Herzegovina expatriate sportspeople in Slovenia
Expatriate footballers in Serbia
Bosnia and Herzegovina expatriate sportspeople in Serbia
Bosnia and Herzegovina football managers
FK Drina Zvornik managers
FK Zvijezda 09 managers
Premier League of Bosnia and Herzegovina managers
Bosnia and Herzegovina expatriate football managers
Expatriate football managers in Serbia